GSK 299423 or GlaxoSmithKline 299423 is an antibiotic chemical compound that has been identified as potentially effective in treating patients infected with bacteria expressing the New Delhi metallo-beta-lactamase. The antibiotic inhibits the enzyme topoisomerase, which bacteria need to replicate.

No animal studies have been reported. No application has been made for human clinical trials.

References

Antibiotics
Quinolines
Piperidines
Nitriles
Phenol ethers
Oxygen heterocycles
Sulfur heterocycles
Nitrogen heterocycles
Heterocyclic compounds with 2 rings